Skjold is a village in Vindafjord municipality in Rogaland county, Norway. Skjold Church is located in the village. The village was the administrative centre of the old municipality of Skjold which existed from 1838 until 1965.

References

Villages in Rogaland
Vindafjord